Alfredo Covelli (22 February 1914 – 25 December 1998) was an Italian monarchist politician. He was the leader of the Monarchist National Party.

Covelli was born in Bonito, Campania.  He graduated in literature and philosophy, in law and political science in the second half of the 1930s, and in 1940 he was a teacher of Latin and Greek in a grammar school in Benevento.

He took part in the Second World War as official in the Air Force, and after a series of operations in Tirana and Bari, he received a decoration for military valor.

In 1946 he was elected a Member of Parliament as a candidate for the National Bloc of Freedom and in the referendum of 2 June he voted to keep the House of Savoy as the royal house of Italy.

In July of the same year he founded the Monarchist National Party, of which he was elected to the Italian Chamber of Deputies in 1948, and so would be until 1976. In the meantime he also devoted himself to journalism, becoming director of the Nation Courier. 
 
In 1964 Covelli also held a management role in football, becoming advisor of the SS Lazio.

In the 1970s he merged his party into the Italian Social Movement, which then became the MSI-DN (the DN standing for destra nazionale or national right). After the merger he duly became chairman of the MSI.

In 1977 Covelli split from the MSI and founded National Democracy a national-conservative political party.  After receiving a meager result of 0.6% of the vote in the election of 1979 Covelli retired from the political scene.

On 15 January 1998 he was appointed by Victor Emmanuel of Savoy honorary president of the honorific Council of the Senators of the Kingdom.

At his request, he was buried in Bonito, his birthplace.

Sources

Italian Chamber of Deputies

1914 births
1998 deaths
People from the Province of Avellino
Monarchist National Party politicians
Italian Democratic Party of Monarchist Unity politicians
Italian Social Movement politicians
National Democracy (Italy) politicians
Members of the Constituent Assembly of Italy
Deputies of Legislature I of Italy
Deputies of Legislature II of Italy
Deputies of Legislature III of Italy
Deputies of Legislature IV of Italy
Deputies of Legislature V of Italy
Deputies of Legislature VI of Italy
Deputies of Legislature VII of Italy
Politicians of Campania
Italian male journalists
Regia Aeronautica personnel of World War II
Italian monarchists
20th-century Italian journalists
20th-century Italian male writers